Jumanne Abdallah Maghembe is a former Minister of Natural Resources and Tourism for the United Republic of Tanzania. He has been a Member of Parliament for Mwanga constituency since 2000 until 2020.

Minister of Natural Resources and Tourism – 2015 to present 
At the beginning of his appointment, Jumanne Maghembe called for a focus on illegal logging and wildlife poaching, as well as working towards doubling tourism's contribution to Tanzania's economy.

Political career 
Before his current position, Professor Maghembe's was serving as Minister of Water and Irrigation, beginning in February 2012 and ending in November 2015.

Education and Academia                                                                                  
In 1975, Maghembe graduated with a degree in Forestry from the University of Dar es Salaam. In 1981 he completed a PhD at the University of Dar es Salaam. In 1986 he was a Fulbright Scholar at Oregon State University. For fifteen years he was a Principal Scientist at the International Center for Research in Agroforestry (ICRAF).

References

Living people
Chama Cha Mapinduzi MPs
Tanzanian MPs 2000–2005
Tanzanian MPs 2005–2010
Tanzanian MPs 2010–2015
Tanzanian MPs 2015–2020
Government ministers of Tanzania
Ministers of agriculture of Tanzania
Dodoma Secondary School alumni
Tosamaganga Secondary School alumni
University of Dar es Salaam alumni
Norwegian College of Agriculture alumni
Duke University alumni
Year of birth missing (living people)